Maya Graf (born 28 February 1962) is a Swiss politician. She is a member of the Council of States from the Canton of Basel-Landschaft. From 2001 to 2019, she was a member of the National Council of Switzerland. From 2012 to 2013, she was the president of the council, the first member of the Green Party to hold that seat.

Graf was first elected to the National Council in 2001 and has been re-elected ever since. She was elected President of the National Council in 2012 with 173 out of 189 delegates voting in her favour.

Personal life 
Graf is married and has two children. She is the daughter of former SVP politician Fritz Graf. Graf was as a social worker before she started to run an organic farm together with her brother.

References 

1962 births
Living people
Green Party of Switzerland politicians
Members of the Council of States (Switzerland)
Members of the National Council (Switzerland)
Presidents of the National Council (Switzerland)
People from Basel-Landschaft
Women members of the National Council (Switzerland)
21st-century Swiss women politicians
21st-century Swiss politicians